The Nubian Nile Party  is a political party that emphasizes issues that pertain to the Nubian community. They are right-leaning politically, and want Nubians to have more rights and representation in politics in Egypt.

References 

Political parties in Egypt
Political parties with year of establishment missing
Nubia
Nubians in Egypt
Political parties of minorities
Right-wing parties